Svetozár Nižňanský (born 6 September 1980) is a Slovak professional ice hockey player who played with HC Slovan Bratislava in the Slovak Extraliga.

References

External links

1980 births
Living people
HC Slovan Bratislava players
Slovak ice hockey players